Mathsci may refer to

 Mathematical sciences
 Mathematics and Science High School at Clover Hill
 MathSciNet, a database of the American Mathematical Society containing data for Mathematical Reviews and Current Mathematical Publications